Bella Hage, commonly known by her married name Bella van der Spiegel-Hage, (born 5 May 1948) is a Dutch former professional cyclist from Sint-Maartensdijk, in the province of Zeeland. She comes from a family of cyclists and is the sister of Keetie Hage, Heleen Hage and Ciska Hage, and an aunt to Jan van Velzen.

Palmarès

1966
1st Dutch National Road Race Championships

1967
1st Dutch National Road Race Championships

1968
1st Dutch National Road Race Championships

1970
3rd Dutch National Road Race Championships

1972
2nd Dutch National Road Race Championships

1978
2nd Dutch National Road Race Championships

References

1948 births
Living people
Dutch female cyclists
People from Tholen
Cyclists from Zeeland